The 2007 Big South Conference baseball tournament  was the postseason baseball tournament for the Big South Conference, held from May 22 through 26 at Winthrop Ballpark, home field of Winthrop in Rock Hill, South Carolina.  All eight teams participated in the double-elimination tournament. The champion, won the title for the eight time, and earned an invitation to the 2007 NCAA Division I baseball tournament.

Format
All eight teams qualified for the tournament.  The teams were seeded one through eight based on conference winning percentage.  The bottom seeds played a single elimination play-in round, with the two winners joining the top four seeds in a six team double-elimination tournament.

Bracket and results

Play-in round

Double-elimination rounds

All-Tournament Team

Most Valuable Player
Tommy Baldridge was named Tournament Most Valuable Player.  Baldridge was an outfielder for Coastal Carolina.

References

Tournament
Big South Conference Baseball Tournament
Big South baseball tournament
Big South Conference baseball tournament